Call My Name is The Brilliant Green's eighth single, released in 1999. It peaked at #12 on the Oricon singles chart.

Track listing

References

1999 singles
The Brilliant Green songs
Songs written by Tomoko Kawase
Songs written by Shunsaku Okuda
1999 songs
Sony Music Entertainment Japan singles